Emmanuel Corrèze (born 9 March 1982) is a retired French professional footballer who played as midfielder.

External links
 Profile at Soccerway

1982 births
Living people
People from Arles
Association football midfielders
French footballers
French expatriate footballers
Expatriate footballers in Belgium
Ligue 1 players
Ligue 2 players
Belgian Pro League players
Olympique de Marseille players
Gazélec Ajaccio players
Beerschot A.C. players
AC Arlésien players
Nîmes Olympique players
Sportspeople from Bouches-du-Rhône
Footballers from Provence-Alpes-Côte d'Azur